The following is a list of notable deaths in April 2016.

Entries for each day are listed alphabetically by surname. A typical entry lists information in the following sequence:
Name, age, country of citizenship and reason for notability, established cause of death, reference.

April 2016

1
Karl-Robert Ameln, 96, Swedish sailor (1948 and 1952 Olympics).
Aleksander Arkuszyński, 98, Polish brigadier general, WWII veteran.
Pratyusha Banerjee, 24, Indian actress, suicide by hanging.
Alan Carter, 86, British civil servant, Director of Immigration of Hong Kong (1983–1989).
Tom Coughlin, 67, American business executive and convicted fraudster (Walmart).
George Curry, 71, American football coach, amyotrophic lateral sclerosis.
Mame Younousse Dieng, 76, Senegalese writer.
Alberto Fontanesi, 87, Italian footballer.
Artur Górski, 46, Polish politician, member of Sejm (since 2005), leukemia.
*Kao Ching-yuen, 87, Taiwanese businessman (Uni-President Enterprises Corporation). (death announced on this date)
Richard S. Kem, 89, American army Major-General.
Emil Keres, 90, Hungarian actor and theatre director.
Clarence Makwetu, 88, South African politician.
Herbert Theodore Milburn, 84, American judge.
John Minney, 76, English cricketer (Cambridge University, Northamptonshire).
Wiebe Nijenhuis, 61, Dutch sportsman.
Carl Nordling, 85, Swedish physicist. 
Marjorie Peters, 97, American baseball player (AAGBPL).
Fausto Puccini, 83, Italian Olympic equestrian.
Patricia Thompson, 89, American philosopher.
André Villers, 85, French photographer. 
Tony Whittaker, 83, British solicitor and politician.
Ron Wicks, 76, Canadian NHL ice hockey referee, liver cancer.

2
Gato Barbieri, 83, Argentine jazz saxophonist, pneumonia.
Rick Bartow, 69, American artist, heart failure.
Moreese Bickham, 98, American convicted murderer and anti-death penalty activist.
Sergio Ferrari, 72, Italian footballer.
Gallieno Ferri, 87, Italian comic book artist (Zagor, Mister No).
Boris Hybner, 74, Czech actor and mime artist.
Gareth Jones, 85, British legal academic.
Martin Lampkin, 65, English motorcycle trials rider, cancer.
Nabil Nosair, 77, Egyptian footballer (Zamalek).
Amber Rayne, 31, American pornographic actress, accidental drug overdose.
Dennis Riggin, 79, Canadian ice hockey player (Detroit Red Wings).
László Sárosi, 84, Hungarian football player and coach.
Thomas Zeng Jing-mu, 95, Chinese clandestine Roman Catholic prelate, Bishop of Yujiang (1988–2012).
Soldiers killed in the Armenian–Azerbaijani clashes:
Robert Abajyan, 19, Armenian (Nagorno-Karabakh Defense Army).
Samid Imanov, 34–35, Azerbaijani (Special Forces).
Murad Mirzayev, 40, Azerbaijani (Special Forces).
Kyaram Sloyan, 19, Armenian (Nagorno-Karabakh Defense Army).

3
Abu Firas al-Suri, 65, Syrian al-Nusra Front senior official, air strike.
Phanor Arizabaleta-Arzayus, 78, Colombian criminal, heart attack. 
John C. Baldwin, 67, American cardiac surgeon, drowned.
John Vane, 11th Baron Barnard, 92, British peer.
Erik Bauersfeld, 93, American radio dramatist (KPFA) and voice actor (Star Wars, A.I. Artificial Intelligence, Crimson Peak).
Ward Crutchfield, 87, American politician, member of the Tennessee Senate (1985–2007).
Bob Ellis, 73, Australian writer (Newsfront, My First Wife) and journalist, liver cancer.
Bas van Erp, 36, Dutch wheelchair tennis player, Paralympic bronze medalist (2004).
Leopoldo Flores, 82, Mexican artist.
Don Francks, 84, Canadian jazz vocalist and actor (La Femme Nikita, Inspector Gadget, I'm Not There), lung cancer.
Robert Guinan, 82, American painter, lymphoma.
Lars Gustafsson, 79, Swedish writer and scholar.
Rowley Habib, 82, New Zealand writer.
Henry Harpending, 72, American anthropologist, stroke.
Bill Henderson, 90, American jazz vocalist and actor (Clue, City Slickers, White Men Can't Jump), cancer.
Dick Hodgins, Jr., 84, American cartoonist.
Ross Honsberger, 87, Canadian mathematician.
Stephen Jacobsen, 75, American bioengineer.
Alex de Jesús, 33, Puerto Rican professional and Olympic lightweight boxer (2004), shot.
Cesare Maldini, 84, Italian football player and manager.
Joe Medicine Crow, 102, American Crow historian.
Ronald Mulkearns, 85, Australian Roman Catholic prelate, Bishop of Ballarat (1971–1997), colon cancer.
Whai Ngata, 74, New Zealand Māori broadcaster, journalist and lexicographer.
Noh Jin-kyu, 23, South Korean short track speed skater, world champion (2011, 2012), osteosarcoma.
Lola Novaković, 80, Serbian singer.
Ian Robinson, 69, Zimbabwean cricket umpire, lung cancer.
Jules Schelvis, 95, Dutch historian and Holocaust survivor.
Kōji Wada, 42, Japanese singer ("Butter-Fly", "All of My Mind"), nasopharynx cancer.
John Waite, 74, English footballer (Grimsby Town).
Clarence Clifton Young, 93, American politician, member of the United States House of Representatives from Nevada's at-large congressional district (1953–1957), Nevada Senate (1966–1980) and Supreme Court (1985–2002).

4
Ranjan Baindoor, 66, Indian cricketer.
Jarle Bondevik, 81, Norwegian philologist.
Archie Dees, 80, American basketball player (Cincinnati Royals, Detroit Pistons).
Eric Dott, 89, owner of Avalon Hill.
Georgi Hristakiev, 71, Bulgarian footballer, Olympic silver medalist (1968).
Shahidul Islam Khokon, 59, Bangladeshi filmmaker, motor neuron disease.
Chus Lampreave, 85, Spanish actress (Belle Époque, Volver).
Carlo Mastrangelo, 78, American bassist and doo-wop singer (The Belmonts).
Getatchew Mekurya, 81, Ethiopian jazz saxophonist.
John Miller, 68, American politician, member of the Virginia Senate (since 2008).
Royston Nash, 82, English conductor (D'Oyly Carte Opera Company).
George Radosevich, 88, American football player (Baltimore Colts).
Mike Sandlock, 100, American baseball player (Brooklyn Dodgers).
Abe Segal, 85, South African tennis player, cancer.
Song Soo-kwon, 76, South Korean writer.
Ken Waterhouse, 86, English footballer (Preston North End, Rotherham United).

5
John Carlson, 82, American sportscaster.
Michael Earls-Davis, 95, English cricketer.
Zyta Gilowska, 66, Polish politician, Minister of Finance (2006, 2007), Deputy Prime Minister (2006, 2007).
Roman Gribbs, 90, American politician, Mayor of Detroit (1970–1974).
Leon Haywood, 74, American funk and soul singer.
Ed Johnson, 71, American basketball player.
Koço Kasapoğlu, 80, Turkish footballer.
George Gelaga King, Sierra Leonean judge.
Zena Latto, 90, American jazz saxophonist.
Kerrie Lester, 62, Australian painter, leukaemia.
Elsie Morison, 91, Australian soprano.
E. M. Nathanson, 88, American author (The Dirty Dozen), heart failure.
Cornel Patrichi, 72, Romanian ballet dancer, choreographer and actor, lung cancer.
Mick Sullivan, 82, English rugby league footballer (Wigan), world champion (1954, 1960).
Ahmed Refai Taha, 61, Egyptian terrorist, leader of al-Gama'a al-Islamiyya, air strike.
Barbara Turner, 79, American actress (Soldier Blue) and screenwriter (Georgia, Pollock, The Company).
Frank Wainright, 48, American football player (Miami Dolphins, Baltimore Ravens), NFL champion (2000).

6
Orison Rudolph Aggrey, 89, American diplomat, Ambassador to the Gambia (1973–1977), Senegal (1973–1977) and Romania (1977–1981).
*Joe Freeman Britt, 80, American attorney and death penalty advocate.
Dennis Davis, 64, American drummer (David Bowie, Stevie Wonder), cancer.
Jaime Pedro Gonçalves, 79, Mozambican Roman Catholic prelate, Archbishop of Beira (1976–2012).
Adrian Greenwood, 42, British art dealer and author, stabbed.
Merle Haggard, 79, American singer-songwriter ("Okie from Muskogee", "The Fightin' Side of Me", "Carolyn"), Grammy winner (1984, 1998, 1999), complications from pneumonia.
Darrell Hogan, 89, American football player (Pittsburgh Steelers).
Bernd Hoss, 76, German football manager.
Garry Jones, 65, English footballer (Bolton Wanderers).
Joel Kurtzman, 68, American economist, cancer.
Robert MacCrate, 94, American lawyer, President of the American Bar Association (1987–1988).
*Ogden Mills Phipps, 75, American horse breeder.
Josef Toms, 94, Czech Olympic basketball player.
Pablo Lucio Vasquez, 38, American convicted murderer, execution by lethal injection.
Murray Wier, 89, American basketball player (Tri-Cities Blackhawks, Waterloo Hawks).

7
László Bárczay, 80, Hungarian chess Grandmaster (FIDE, ICCF).
Freda Briggs, 85, English-born Australian professor and child protection expert, Senior Australian of the Year (2000).
A. V. Christie, 53, American poet, breast cancer.
Frank E. Denholm, 92, American politician, member of the United States House of Representatives from South Dakota's 1st congressional district (1971–1975).
Marcel Dubé, 86, Canadian playwright.
Hendrikje Fitz, 54, German actress (In aller Freundschaft), cancer.
Theodore van Houten, 63, Dutch–British author and journalist.
Vladimir Kagan, 88, American furniture designer.
Cyril Edel Leonoff, 91, Canadian civil engineer and historian.
Carlo Monti, 96, Italian athlete, Olympic bronze medalist (1948).
Blackjack Mulligan, 73, American professional wrestler (WWWF, JCP, CWF).
Charles Thomas, 87, British archaeologist. 
Jimmie Van Zant, 59, American singer, songwriter and guitarist, liver cancer.
Chuck Waseleski, 61, American baseball statistician (Boston Red Sox).
Ruth Westbrook, 85, English cricket player and coach (national team).
 Sir John Yocklunn, 82, Australian–Papua New Guinean librarian and government advisor.

8
Nicolas Abu Samah, 76–77, Lebanese actor and director.
Dick Alban, 87, American football player (Washington Redskins, Pittsburgh Steelers).
Mircea Albulescu, 81, Romanian actor and writer, heart failure.
Harry Apted, 90, Fijian cricketer.
Victoria Chitepo, 88, Zimbabwean politician.
Anatol Ciobanu, 81, Moldovan linguist, writer and university professor.
David Dore, 75, Canadian figure skating competitor, judge and official, President (1980–1984) and Director General (1986–2004) of the CFSA.
Phoebus Dhrymes, 82, American economist.
Doug France, 62, American football player (Los Angeles Rams).
Paul Fung Jr., 93, American cartoonist (Blondie).
Mildred Gordon, 92, British politician, MP for Bow and Poplar (1987–1997).
William Hamilton, 76, American cartoonist, traffic collision.
Jack Hammer, 90, American musician and songwriter ("Great Balls of Fire").
Charles Hirsch, 79, American forensic pathologist.
Julien Hoferlin, 49, Belgian tennis coach (national team), cancer.
George Ilsley, 88, Australian football player (Carlton).
Grace Lotowycz, 99, American botanist.
Fred Middleton, 85, English footballer (Lincoln City).
Elizabeth Roemer, 87, American astronomer.
Erich Rudorffer, 98, German Luftwaffe fighter ace during World War II.
Gene Salvay, 96, American aircraft engineer.
David Swift, 85, British actor (Drop the Dead Donkey).
*Wei Chueh, 88, Taiwanese Buddhist monk, founder of the Chung Tai Shan.
Nigel Paulet, 18th Marquess of Winchester, 74, British peer, member of the House of Lords (1968–1999).

9
Frederic W. Allen, 89, American judge.
Arthur Anderson, 93, American actor (Courage the Cowardly Dog, Midnight Cowboy), voice of Lucky Charms leprechaun.
Frank Baron, 93, Dominican politician.
Duane Clarridge, 83, American spy (CIA, Eclipse Group), complications from esophageal cancer.
Tony Conrad, 76, American avant-garde musician, composer, video artist and professor (University at Buffalo), pneumonia.
Juris Ekmanis, 74, Latvian academic, President of Latvian Academy of Sciences (2004–2012).
Finn Hodt, 96, Norwegian Olympic speed skating competitor (1956) and coach.
J. Vinton Lawrence, 76, American CIA paramilitary officer, acute myeloid leukemia.
Bea Maddock, 81, Australian artist.
Lucas Martínez Lara, 70, Mexican Roman Catholic prelate, Bishop of Matehuala (since 2006).
Patrick J. O'Donnell, 68, Scottish academic.
Martin Roberts, 48, English rugby union player (Gloucester Rugby).
Derrick Rochester, 76, Jamaican politician and trade unionist, MP for South East St Elizabeth (1972–1980, 1989–2002), member of the Senate (1980–1983).
Will Smith, 34, American football player (New Orleans Saints), Super Bowl champion (2010), shot.

10
Alec Crikis, 71, Australian Olympic sports shooter.
John Ferrone, 91, American book editor (The Color Purple), complications from Parkinson's disease.
Louis Gladstone, 88, American politician.
Nicholas Hood, 92, American politician and civil rights activist, Detroit City Councilman (1965–1993).
Irene Maguire, 86, American figure skater, heart failure.
Howard Marks, 70, Welsh cannabis smuggler, writer and legalisation campaigner, colorectal cancer.
Thomas Kwaku Mensah, 81, Ghanaian Roman Catholic prelate, Bishop of Obuasi (1995–2008) and Archbishop of Kumasi (2008–2012).
Wayne Southwick, 93, American surgeon and academic.
Henryk Średnicki, 61, Polish Olympic boxer (1976, 1980), amateur World Champion (1978).
N. H. Wadia, 91, Indian neurologist.

11
Tony Ayers, 82, Australian public servant.
Helen Bailey, 51, British author, suffocated.
Doug Banks, 57, American radio personality (The Doug Banks Radio Show), diabetes.
João Carvalho, 28, Portuguese mixed martial arts fighter, injuries sustained in match.
Albert Filozov, 78, Russian actor.
Emile Ford, 78, Saint Lucian singer ("What Do You Want to Make Those Eyes at Me For?") and sound engineer.
Hokie Gajan, 56, American football player and broadcaster (New Orleans Saints), liposarcoma.
Mohsen Gheytaslou, 25–26, Iranian soldier (65th Airborne Special Forces Brigade).
Ruth Gilbert, 99, New Zealand poet.
Yura Halim, 92, Bruneian politician, Chief Minister (1967–1972) and lyricist (national anthem).
Anne Gould Hauberg, 98, American arts patron, founder of the Pilchuck Glass School.
Alan Hurd, 78, English cricketer.
Peter J. Jannetta, 84, American neurosurgeon (Allegheny General Hospital).
Dame Marion Kettlewell, 102, British naval officer, Director of the Wrens (1966–1970). 
Huntly D. Millar, 88, Canadian medical technology executive.
*Miss Shangay Lily, 53, Spanish drag queen, pancreatic cancer.
Édgar Perea, 81, Colombian politician and football commentator.
Steve Quinn, 64, British rugby league player (York, Featherstone Rovers).
Richard Ransom, 96, American businessman (Hickory Farms).
Ed Snider, 83, American sports executive (Comcast Spectacor, Philadelphia Flyers, Philadelphia 76ers), bladder cancer.
A. R. Surendran, Sri Lankan lawyer, President's Counsel (2004).
Bounama Touré, 63, Senegalese Olympic wrestler.

12
James Bond, 70, Australian navy officer. 
Aquilino Bonfanti, 73, Italian footballer. 
Robbie Brennan, 68–69, Irish musician (Skid Row, Auto Da Fé, Grand Slam).
Hector A. Cafferata Jr., 86, American soldier, Medal of Honor recipient.
Paul Carey, 88, American radio broadcaster (Detroit Tigers), chronic obstructive pulmonary disease.
Gianroberto Casaleggio, 61, Italian entrepreneur, co-founder of Five Star Movement.
Pedro de Felipe, 71, Spanish footballer (Real Madrid, Espanyol).
David Gest, 62, American TV producer (Michael Jackson: 30th Anniversary Special) and reality show contestant (I'm a Celebrity...Get Me Out of Here!).
Gib Guilbeau, 78, American musician (The Flying Burrito Brothers) and composer (Boxcar Bertha).
Anne Jackson, 90, American actress (The Shining, Folks!, Dirty Dingus Magee).
Bryce Jordan, 91, American academic administrator, President of the Pennsylvania State University (1983–1990).
Alexander Kanengoni, 65, Zimbabwean writer, heart failure.
Alan Loveday, 88, New Zealand-born British violinist (Royal Philharmonic Orchestra, Academy of St Martin in the Fields).
Balls Mahoney, 44, American professional wrestler (ECW, WWE, SMW), heart attack.
André Mayamba Mabuti Kathongo, 85, Congolese Roman Catholic prelate, Bishop of Popokabaka (1979–1993).
Tōru Ōhira, 86, Japanese voice actor (Super Sentai, One Piece).
Tibor Ordina, 45, Hungarian Olympic track and field athlete (1996), brain cancer.
Tomaž Pandur, 53, Slovenian theatre director.
Spec Richardson, 93, American baseball executive (Houston Astros).
Agha Saleem, 81, Pakistani writer.
Sir Arnold Wesker, 83, British playwright.
Said Zahari, 88, Singaporean journalist and political prisoner.

13
Srinivas Aravamudan, 54, Indian-born British academic.
Márton Balázs, 86, Romanian mathematician.
Jackie Carter, 62, American children's author, lymphoma.
*Julio García Espinosa, 89, Cuban film director and screenwriter (The Adventures of Juan Quin Quin).
Nuri Gezerdaa, 56, Abkhaz politician.
Kurtis Haiu, 31, New Zealand rugby union player (Auckland, Blues), bone cancer.
Earl B. Hunt, 83, American psychologist.
Matthias Joseph Isuja, 86, Tanzanian Roman Catholic prelate, Bishop of Dodoma (1972–2005).
Robert W. Lundeen, 94, American executive (Tektronix).
Mariano Mores, 98, Argentine tango composer and pianist.
Eeti Nieminen, 89, Finnish Olympic Nordic skier (1952).
Rex Patterson, 89, Australian politician, MP for Dawson (1966–1975). 
Jock Scot, 63, Scottish poet and recording artist, cancer.
Manouchehr Sotoudeh, 102, Iranian geographer and scholar of Persian literature, lung infection.
Jeremy Steig, 73, American jazz flutist.
Gareth Thomas, 71, Welsh actor (Blake's 7, Children of the Stones, Star Maidens), heart failure.
Gwyn Thomas, 79, Welsh poet and academic, National Poet (2006–2008).
Ray Thornton, 87, American attorney and politician, member of the United States House of Representatives from Arkansas's 4th and 2nd congressional districts (1973–1979, 1991–1997).
Nera White, 80, American Hall of Fame basketball player.
Bernard B. Wolfe, 101, American politician, member of the Illinois House of Representatives (1965–1974).
Pete Yellin, 74, American jazz saxophonist and educator.
Sayed Zayan, 72, Egyptian actor.

14
Nguyen Anh 9, 76, Vietnamese songwriter and pianist.
Ahmed Brahim, 69, Tunisian politician.
David Collischon, 78, British executive (Filofax). 
Martin Fitzmaurice, 75, English darts personality.
Gaetano Gagliano, 98, Canadian entrepreneur.
Francesco Guarraci, 61, Italian-born American mobster.
Hector Hatch, 80, Fijian boxer (1956 Olympics), politician and civil servant.
Fred Hayman, 90, Swiss-born American fashion retailer (Giorgio Beverly Hills) and entrepreneur, helped develop Rodeo Drive.
James W. Huston, 62, American author and lawyer.
Dan Ireland, 57, Canadian-born American film producer and director (Jolene, The Whole Wide World, Mrs. Palfrey at the Claremont).
Ilija Ivezić, 89, Croatian film actor (Last of the Renegades, The Golden Years, Marshal Tito's Spirit).
Colin Knight, 81, New Zealand educationalist, principal of Christchurch Teachers' College (1986–1995).
Liang Sili, 91, Chinese missile control scientist and academician (Chinese Academy of Sciences), vice-president of the International Astronautical Federation.
Sir David MacKay, 48, British author, physicist and professor (University of Cambridge), stomach cancer.
Rod Reyes, 80, Filipino broadcast executive and journalist (The Standard), heart failure.
Phil Sayer, 62, British voice artist, oesophageal cancer.
Malick Sidibé, 80, Malian photographer. 
Xu Caidong, 97, Chinese metallurgist and academician (Chinese Academy of Sciences), vice-governor of Guizhou.
Ron Theobald, 72, American baseball player (Milwaukee Brewers).
Carl M. Vogel, 61, American politician, member of the Missouri Senate (2003–2011), pancreatic cancer.

15
Orville Gilbert Brim, Jr., 93, American social psychologist.
Anne Grommerch, 45, French politician, member of the National Assembly (since 2008), Mayor of Thionville (since 2014), breast cancer.
Byrle Klinck, 81, Canadian Olympic ice hockey player, bronze medallist (1956). 
Laura Liu, 49, American state judge, Cook County Circuit Court judge (2010–2014), Illinois Appellate Court judge (since 2014), breast cancer.
Frederick Mayer, 94, German-born American spy (OSS).
Derek Mayers, 81, English footballer (Preston North End).
A. A. Raiba, 94, Indian painter.
Harold Shillinglaw, 88, Australian football player and cricketer.
Morag Siller, 46, British actress (Emmerdale, Memphis Belle, Casualty), breast cancer. 
Richard Smith, 84, British painter, heart failure.
Lars-Inge Svartenbrandt, 70, Swedish criminal, apartment fire.
Louis Van Geyt, 88, Belgian politician, chairman of Communist Party of Belgium (1972–1989).
Guy Woolfenden, 78, English composer and conductor.

16
Muhammad Ayyub, 64, Saudi Arabian imam and Islamic scholar.
Ron Bonham, 73, American basketball player (Boston Celtics, Indiana Pacers), NBA champion (1965, 1966).
Jeanette Bonnier, 82, Swedish media proprietor (Bonnier Group), journalist (Expressen) and author.
David R. Brown, 93, American computer scientist.
Miloud Chaabi, 86, Moroccan businessman.
Rod Daniel, 73, American film director (Teen Wolf, K-9, WKRP in Cincinnati), Parkinson's disease.
Donald B. Easum, 92, American diplomat.
William M. Gray, 86, American meteorologist.
Guan Guangfu, 84, Chinese politician, Communist Party Chief of Hubei.
Bernhard Hassenstein, 93, German biologist and behaviorist.
Charlie Hodge, 82, Canadian ice hockey player (Montreal Canadiens, Vancouver Canucks) and scout.
Clarence James, 84, Bermudian politician, Deputy Premier (1983–1989).
Maurice Kenny, 86, American poet, heart ailment and kidney failure.
Rubén Mendoza Ayala, 55, Mexican politician. 
Nathanael Orr, 98, Australian politician, member of the New South Wales Legislative Council (1976–1984).
U Pandita, 94, Burmese Buddhist monk and meditation teacher.
Louis Pilot, 75, Luxembourgian football player (Fola Esch, Standard Liège, Royal Antwerp) and manager (national team).
Ilias Polatidis, 50, Greek politician.
Ismael Quintana, 78, Puerto Rican singer and composer.
Peter Rock, 70, Austrian-born Chilean rock musician.
Helmut Rohde, 90, German politician.
Kit West, 79, British special effects artist (Raiders of the Lost Ark, Dragonheart, Enemy at the Gates), Oscar winner (1982).

17
Ken Aldred, 70, Australian politician, MP for Henty (1975–1980), Bruce (1983–1990) and Deakin (1990–1996).
Tiga Bayles, 62, Australian radio presenter and indigenous rights activist, cancer.
Kong Bunchhoeun, 77, Cambodian author and songwriter, cancer.
Bettye Caldwell, 91, American educator (University of Arkansas at Little Rock) and child-development campaigner (NAEYC).
Bob Charles, 79, American-born Australian politician, MP for La Trobe (1990–2004).
Chyna, 46, American professional wrestler (WWF) and actress (1 Night in China, 3rd Rock from the Sun, Cougar Club), mixed drug intoxication.
Clifton C. Garvin, 94, American businessman, CEO of Exxon (1975–1986).
Luis Horacio Gomez González, 57, Colombian Roman Catholic prelate, Vicar Apostolic of Puerto Gaitán (2014–2016).
Anthony Keane, 87, American Olympic fencer (1968).
Toshiro Konishi, 63, Japanese-born Peruvian chef, pioneer of Japanese cuisine in Lima, cancer.
Bruce Mansfield, 71, Australian radio and television personality, prostate cancer.
Scott Nimerfro, 54, American writer and producer (Hannibal, Once Upon a Time, X-Men), angiosarcoma.
Constantine Papastephanou, 92, Syrian Eastern Orthodox prelate, Metropolitan of Baghdad and Kuwait (1969-2014). 
Doris Roberts, 90, American actress (Everybody Loves Raymond, Remington Steele, Christmas Vacation), stroke.
Trần Phước Thọ, 23, Vietnamese footballer (Long An, U23 national team), traffic collision.
Nicolas Tikhomiroff, 89, French photographer.
Yang Hongxun, 84, Chinese architect, architectural historian, and archaeologist.

18
Brian Asawa, 49, American opera singer, heart failure.
Paul Busiek, 93, American politician.
Yuri Bychkov, 84, Russian art historian.
William Campbell, 75, American business executive (Apple) and college football coach (Columbia University), cancer.
Adrian Berry, 4th Viscount Camrose, 78, British journalist.
Robert Christophe, 78, French Olympic swimmer (1956, 1960, 1964), European champion (1958, 1962). 
Barry Davies, 71, British soldier and author, heart attack. 
Rubén Héctor di Monte, 84, Argentinian Roman Catholic prelate, Archbishop of Mercedes-Luján (2000–2007).
Marwan Dudin, 79–80, Jordanian politician, Minister of Agriculture (1980–1984) and Minister of State for the Occupied Territory Affairs (1986–1988).
Hugh Faulkner, 83, Canadian politician, MP for Peterborough (1965–1979), complications from surgery.
Ben-Zion Gold, 92, Polish-born American rabbi.
Cox Habbema, 72, Dutch actress, theater director and manager.
Eva Henning, 95, Swedish stage and movie actress.
Fritz Herkenrath, 87, German footballer (Rot-Weiss Essen).
Karina Huff, 55, British actress (The House of Clocks, Time for Loving, Voices from Beyond) and television personality, breast cancer.
Proverb Jacobs, 80, American football player (Philadelphia Eagles, New York Giants).
Sir John Leslie, 4th Baronet, 99, Anglo-Irish aristocrat and media personality.
Arnulfo Mejía Rojas, 59, Mexican architect and Catholic priest.
Johan van Minnen, 83, Dutch journalist and politician, member of the European Parliament (1979–1984).
Vladimir Nemukhin, 90, Russian painter (Bulldozer Exhibition).
Charles J. Pilliod Jr., 97, American business executive and diplomat, Ambassador to Mexico (1986–1989).
Guy Prather, 58, American football player (Green Bay Packers), cancer.
Fulvio Roiter, 89, Italian photographer, Prix Nadar winner (1956).
Pál Sajgó, 93, Hungarian cross country skier and biathlete.
Gert Schramm, 87, German Holocaust survivor.
Zoltán Szarka, 73, Hungarian football player and coach, Olympic champion (1968).
Tao Siju, 81, Chinese politician, minister of Public Security.

19
Gerasimos Arsenis, 84, Greek politician, Minister for National Defense (1993–1996) and National Education and Religious Affairs (1996–2000).
Patricio Aylwin, 97, Chilean politician, President (1990–1994).
Estelle Balet, 21, Swiss snowboarder, world champion (2015, 2016), avalanche.
Dud Beattie, 81, Australian rugby league footballer and selector (Queensland).
Errikos Belies, 66, Greek translator and poet.
Dorothy R. Burnley, 89, American politician, member of the North Carolina General Assembly (1980–1984).
Eloy Casados, 66, American actor (Ishi: The Last of His Tribe, Walker, Texas Ranger).
Russell Dove, 87, Australian Olympic sports shooter (1972).
Harry Elderfield, 72, British geochemist and professor (University of Cambridge).
Ronit Elkabetz, 51, Israeli actress and film director (Gett: The Trial of Viviane Amsalem), lung cancer.
Solveig Ericsson, 84, Swedish Olympic athlete.
*Karl-Heinz von Hassel, 77, German actor.
Walter Kohn, 93, Austrian-born American theoretical physicist, Nobel laureate (1998), jaw cancer.
Lord Tanamo, 81, Jamaican ska and mento musician.
John McConathy, 86, American basketball player (Milwaukee Hawks, Northwestern State).
Mehrdad Oladi, 30, Iranian footballer (Malavan), heart attack.
Milt Pappas, 76, American baseball player (Baltimore Orioles, Cincinnati Reds, Chicago Cubs).
Billy Redmayne, 25, Manx motorcycle racer, race collision.
Igor Volchok, 84, Russian football manager.
Pete Zorn, 65, American musician (Steeleye Span, Richard Thompson, The Albion Band), cancer.

20
Solomon Blatt Jr., 94, American federal judge, U.S. District Court for South Carolina (since 1971).
Cynthia Cooke, 96, British nurse, Matron-in-Chief of the Queen Alexandra's Royal Naval Nursing Service (1973–1976).
Velda González, 83, Puerto Rican actress and politician. 
Guy Hamilton, 93, French-born British film director (James Bond, Battle of Britain, Evil Under the Sun).
Avril Henry, 81, British academic, suicide. 
Dame Leonie Kramer, 91, Australian academic, author and university administrator.
Attila Özdemiroğlu, 73, Turkish composer, lung cancer.
Solly Pandor, 58, Zambian football manager.
Harry Perkowski, 93, American baseball player (Chicago Cubs, Cincinnati Reds).
Qi Benyu, 85, Chinese politician and propagandist, cancer.
Jack Tafari, 69, British activist, liver failure.
Giannis Voglis, 78, Greek actor.
Dwayne Washington, 52, American basketball player (New Jersey Nets, Miami Heat, Syracuse University), brain cancer.
Vern Wilson, 85, American Olympic athlete.
Victoria Wood, 62, British comedian and actress (New Faces, Victoria Wood: As Seen on TV, dinnerladies), cancer.
Yu Songlie, 95, Chinese agricultural scientist, educator and academician (Chinese Academy of Engineering).

21
Frederick Bruce-Lyle, 62, Ghanaian-born Saint Vincentian judge in the Caribbean.
Valeriu Cotea, 89, Romanian oenologist, member of Romanian Academy, cardiac arrest.
Norbert Esnault, 87, French cyclist.
Nade Haley, 68, American artist.
Levi Karuhanga, 60, Ugandan major general.
Per-Simon Kildal, 64, Swedish antenna specialist. 
Hans Koschnick, 87, German politician and diplomat, Bremen Senate president and mayor (1967–1985), President of the Bundesrat (1970–1971, 1981–1982), MP (1987–1998).
Marco Leto, 85, Italian film and television director (Black Holiday, Al piacere di rivederla).
Franz Lorette, 80, Belgian Olympic hockey player.
Lonnie Mack, 74, American singer-guitarist (The Wham of that Memphis Man).
Toshio Mashima, 67, Japanese composer, cancer.
D. B. Nihalsinghe, 77, Sri Lankan filmmaker (Welikathara). 
Utako Okamoto, 98, Japanese medical scientist.
Ferenc Paragi, 62, Hungarian Olympic javelin thrower (1976, 1980), world record holder (1980–1983).
Prince, 57, American musician, songwriter ("When Doves Cry", "Little Red Corvette", "Purple Rain") and actor, Oscar (1984) and Grammy (1984, 1986, 2004, 2007) winner, accidental overdose of fentanyl.
Peter Ruckman, 94, American Independent Baptist pastor.
Smoke Glacken, 22, American Thoroughbred racehorse, winner of the Hopeful Stakes (1996).
Dene Smuts, 66, South African politician, MP (1989–2014).
John Walton, Baron Walton of Detchant, 93, British politician, member of the House of Lords (since 1989).

22
David Beresford, 68, British journalist.
Yvon Charbonneau, 75, Canadian politician, stroke.
Rudolph Chimelli, 87, German journalist and author.
Isabelle Dinoire, 49, French mauled woman, first person to undergo a partial face transplant.
Rex Fell, 71, New Zealand Thoroughbred breeder.
Ojārs Grīnbergs, 73, Latvian singer, lung cancer.
Roger Khawam, 94, Egyptian antique dealer and Egyptologist.
John Lumsden, 55, Scottish footballer (Stoke City).
Ariffin Mohammed, 74, Malaysian cult leader (Sky Kingdom).
Robert Price, 83, American attorney and political campaign manager. 
Jory Prum, 41, American audio engineer and video game developer (Adaptation, The Walking Dead, Brütal Legend), traffic collision.
Manfred Rein, 68, Austrian politician (ÖVP).
Peter Sellers, 94, New Zealand sports broadcaster.
Soran Singh, Pakistani politician, member of the Khyber Pakhtunkhwa Assembly (since 2013), shot.
Sir Denys Wilkinson, 93, British nuclear physicist.
Anne Wolden-Ræthinge, 86, Danish author and journalist.

23
Ron Brace, 29, American football player (Boston College, New England Patriots), apparent heart attack.
Alfons Van den Brande, 88, Belgian cyclist.
Carla Braan, 54, Dutch Olympic gymnast.
Errol Crossan, 85, Canadian footballer (Norwich City).
Attila Ferjáncz, 69, Hungarian racing driver, Hungarian Rally champion (1976–1982, 1985, 1990).
Luis González Seara, 79, Spanish politician.
Inge King, 100, German-born Australian sculptor.
Vjatšeslav Kobrin, 58, Russian guitarist and songwriter.
Tom Muecke, 52, American CFL player (Winnipeg Blue Bombers, Edmonton Eskimos), heart attack.
Tony Munro, 52, Australian sports journalist, stroke.
Sir Richard Parsons, 88, British diplomat, Ambassador to Hungary, Spain and Sweden.
Jacques Perry, 94, French novelist.
Maurice Peston, Baron Peston, 85, English economist and politician, member of the House of Lords (since 1987).
Miguel Picazo, 89, Spanish film director, screenwriter and actor (La Tía Tula).
John Steven Satterthwaite, 87, Australian Roman Catholic prelate, Bishop of Lismore (1971–2001).
Bill Sevesi, 92, Tongan-born New Zealand musician.
Madeleine Sherwood, 93, Canadian actress (Cat on a Hot Tin Roof, The Flying Nun).
Banharn Silpa-archa, 83, Thai politician, Prime Minister (1995–1996), asthma.
Horace Ward, 88, American judge.
Paul Hisao Yasuda, 94, Japanese Roman Catholic prelate, Archbishop of Osaka (1978–1997).

24
Zafar Ishaq Ansari, 84, Pakistani Islamic scholar, heart attack.
Paul Annear, 68, New Zealand jeweller.
Nina Arkhipova, 94, Russian film and stage actress (Burnt by the Sun).
Chen Shilu, 95, Chinese flight mechanic, educator and academician (Chinese Academy of Engineering).
Manuel de la Torre, 94, Spanish-born American golf player and instructor.
Robert Dolan, 87, American marine geologist.
Walter Jackson Freeman III, 89, American biologist.
Perry O. Hooper Sr., 91, American judge, Chief Justice of the Supreme Court of Alabama (1995–2001).
Steve Julian, 57, American radio host (KPCC), brain cancer.
Kiviaq, 80, Canadian lawyer, politician, boxer and football player, cancer.
Tommy Kono, 85, American weightlifter, Olympic champion (1952, 1956), world champion (1953–1959), complications from liver disease.
Thinle Lhondup, 72, Nepalese actor (Himalaya), fall.
Benjamin Manglona, 78, Northern Mariana Islands politician, Lieutenant Governor (1990–1994), stroke.
Ricardo Torres Origel, 59, Mexican politician.
Lizette Parker, 44, American politician, Mayor of Teaneck, New Jersey (since 2014), respiratory illness.
Billy Paul, 81, American R&B singer ("Me and Mrs. Jones"), pancreatic cancer.
George Pieterson, 74, Dutch clarinetist.
Terry Redlin, 78, American artist, Alzheimer's disease.
Klaus Siebert, 60, German biathlon athlete and coach, world champion (1978, 1979), Olympic silver medalist (1980).
Papa Wemba, 66, Congolese singer, seizure.
George Alexis Weymouth, 79, American artist and conservationist, heart failure.

25
Dumitru Antonescu, 71, Romanian footballer (Farul Constanța).
Remo Belli, 88, American drummer, developed the synthetic drumhead (Remo), complications of pneumonia.
Joe Blahak, 65, American football player (Minnesota Vikings).
Nicolae Esinencu, 76, Moldovan screenwriter and writer.
Göte Gåård, 84, Swedish Olympic sports shooter.
Mel George, 80, American professor and twice interim president of the University of Missouri.
Martin Gray, 93, Polish Holocaust survivor and writer.
Michal Hornstein, 95, Polish-born Canadian executive.
Tom Lewis, 94, Australian politician, Premier of New South Wales (1975–1976).
Patrick Fabionn Lopes, 35, Brazilian football player, brain aneurysm.
Xulhaz Mannan, 39, Bangladeshi editor, stabbed.
*Mei Baojiu, 82, Chinese Peking opera artist, bronchospasm.
Poornima Arvind Pakvasa, 102, Indian social worker.
Neculai Rățoi, 77, Romanian politician, mayor of Pașcani (1981–2008).
John Ridsdel, 68, Canadian journalist (Calgary Herald), businessman (Petro-Canada) and Abu Sayyaf hostage, beheaded.
Horst Sachs, 89, German mathematician.
Samantha Schubert, 47, Malaysian actress and beauty queen, Miss Malaysia (1991), pancreatic cancer.
Rudolf Wessely, 91, Austrian actor.

26
Raymond Casey, 98, British geologist and philatelist.
Vincent Darius, 60, Grenadian Roman Catholic prelate, Bishop of Saint George's in Grenada (since 2002), pneumonia.
Arne Elsholtz, 71, German voice actor.
Mark Farmer, 53, British actor (Grange Hill, Minder, Johnny Jarvis), cancer.
Winston Hill, 74, American football player (New York Jets), Super Bowl winner (1968).
William H. Jarvis, 85, Canadian politician.
Amanullah Khan, 82, Pakistani Kashmir separatism activist (JKLF), COPD.
Lucy Kibaki, 82, Kenyan teacher and socialite, First Lady (2002–2013).
M. H. Mohamed, 94, Sri Lankan politician.
Álvaro Pérez Treviño, 85, Mexican politician.
Peter Propping, 73, German geneticist. 
Ozzie Silna, 83, American basketball owner (Spirits of St. Louis), cancer.
Martin Szipál, 91, Hungarian photographer, prostate cancer.
Masako Togawa, 85, Japanese feminist, singer, actress and novelist.
Dorothy Warburton, 80, Canadian geneticist.
James H. Ware, 74, American biostatistician, cancer.
Willie L. Williams, 72, American police commissioner (Los Angeles, Philadelphia).
Harry Wu, 79, Chinese human rights activist, founder of the Laogai Research Foundation.
Vladimir Yulygin, 80, Russian football player and coach.

27
James Arvaluk, 68, Canadian politician.
James Carroll, 60, American-born Canadian actor (Wind at My Back, Red Dead Redemption, Death to Smoochy), small cell lung cancer.
Harold Cohen, 87, British computer artist (AARON).
Angela Flanders, 88, British perfumer. 
Viktor Gavrikov, 58, Lithuanian-Swiss chess Grandmaster.
Herta Groves, 96, Austrian-born British milliner, traffic collision. 
Philip Kives, 87, Canadian marketing entrepreneur, founder of K-tel.
Julio Xavier Labayen, 89, Filipino Roman Catholic prelate, territorial prelate of Infanta (1966–2003).
Liu Lianman, 82, Chinese mountain climber, made the first ascent of Muztagh Ata.
Robert C. Mathis, 88, American air force general.
Chris Parkinson, 74, New Zealand broadcaster, co-founder of Radio Hauraki.
Ray Salazar, 85, American politician, Mayor of El Paso, Texas (1977–1979).
Gabriele Sima, 61, Austrian opera singer.
Toms, 87, Indian cartoonist (Boban and Molly).

28
Anderson Agiru, 54, Papua New Guinean politician. 
Óscar Marcelino Álvarez, 67, Argentine footballer (Panathinaikos).
Sir Edward Ashmore, 96, British officer in the Royal Navy, First Sea Lord (1974–1977).
Conrad Burns, 81, American politician, Senator from Montana (1989–2007).
Enrique Cal Pardo, 93, Spanish priest, teacher and writer.
Ed Davender, 49, American basketball player (Kentucky Wildcats).
Jenny Diski, 68, English writer (Nothing Natural, Rainforest, London Review of Books), lung cancer.
Joe Durham, 84, American baseball player (Baltimore Orioles, St. Louis Cardinals).
Igor Fesunenko, 83, Russian journalist, foreign affairs writer and teacher (MGIMO).
Charles Gatewood, 73, American photographer, suicide by jumping.
Fredrik Grønningsæter, 92, Norwegian priest, Bishop of Sør-Hålogaland (1982–1992).
René Hausman, 80, Belgian comic book writer and illustrator.
Barry Howard, 78, English actor (Hi-de-Hi!), blood cancer.
Georg Kronawitter, 88, German politician, Mayor of Munich (1972–1978, 1984–1993). 
Ingram Olkin, 91, American statistics professor, colorectal cancer.
David Page, 55, Australian composer, musical director of Bangarra Dance Theatre.
Mohamed Roushdi, 94, Egyptian gymnast.
Blackie Sherrod, 96, American sportswriter.

29
Tim Bacon, 52, British restaurateur and actor.
Alyson Bailes, 67, British diplomat, Ambassador to Finland (2000–2002). 
Sherry Cassuto, 59, American Olympic rower.
*Chen Zhongshi, 73, Chinese writer, oral cancer.
Jok Church, 66, American cartoonist (You Can with Beakman and Jax).
Renato Corona, 67, Filipino jurist, Chief Justice of the Supreme Court (2010–2012), complications from a heart attack.
Patrick Deuel, 54, American reality TV star.
Bob Fitch, 76, American photojournalist.
Erediauwa, 92, Nigerian traditional royal, Oba of Benin (since 1979). (death announced on this date)
Dmytro Hnatyuk, 91, Ukrainian baritone opera singer.
Hilarius Moa Nurak, 73, Indonesian Roman Catholic prelate, Bishop of Pangkal-Pinang (since 1987).
Dave Robinson, 67, English footballer (Birmingham City, Walsall). (death announced on this date)
Jigdal Dagchen Sakya, 86, Tibetan Buddhist teacher.
Don White, 89, American stock car racing driver.
Wojciech Zagórski, 87, Polish actor.

30
Daniel Aaron, 103, American writer and academic (Harvard University), co-founder of the Library of America.
Michael Edward Ash, 88, British brewer.
Daniel Berrigan, 94, American Jesuit priest, poet, peace activist and ex-convict (Catonsville Nine).
Wayne Crawford, 69, American actor, writer and producer (Valley Girl, Jake Speed).
Alphonsus F. D'Souza, 76, Indian Roman Catholic prelate, Bishop of Raiganj (since 1987), heart attack.
Franco Di Giacomo, 83, Italian cinematographer.
Marisol Escobar, 85, French-born American sculptor.
Uwe Friedrichsen, 81, German actor (Faust, Schwarz Rot Gold, Sesamstraße).
Guido Gillarduzzi, 76, Italian Olympic speed skater.
Fritz Janschka, 97, Austrian-born American artist.
Sir Harry Kroto, 76, British chemist, laureate of the Nobel Prize in Chemistry (1996).
Réjean Lafrenière, 80, Canadian politician, member of the Quebec National Assembly (1989–2007).
Ellen Niit, 87, Estonian children's writer, poet and translator.
Scott Rains, 59, American travel writer, brain tumor.
Phil Ryan, 69, Welsh keyboardist (Man).
Tracy Scott, 46, American script supervisor (Whiplash, Concussion, Garden State), cancer.
Peter Thomas, 91, American narrator (Nova, Forensic Files).
Vasily Zvyagintsev, 71, Russian science fiction author.

References

2016-04
 04